Persicula sagittata is a species of sea snail, a marine gastropod mollusk, in the family Cystiscidae.

References

sagittata
Gastropods described in 1844
Cystiscidae